Justice Brayton may refer to:

Charles Brayton (judge) (1772–1834), associate justice of the Rhode Island Supreme Court
George A. Brayton (1803–1880), associate justice of the Rhode Island Supreme Court
William Brayton (Vermont judge) (1787–1828), associate justice of the Vermont Supreme Court